TeST Junior may refer to one of a series of motor gliders:

TeST TST-7 Junior
TeST TST-9 Junior
TeST TST-13 Junior